Oakland Duets is a live album by saxophonist Julius Hemphill and cellist Abdul Wadud. It was recorded at the Oakland Museum in Oakland, California, on November 13 and 14, 1992, and was released by Music & Arts in 1993.

Reception

In a review for AllMusic, Thom Jurek called the album "the absolute statement from these two artists who played literally hundreds of gigs but recorded together only six times," and wrote: "the disc... is a stomp of one color and style after another, painting a dizzying yet soulful tapestry of musical prowess and emotional honesty lacquered generously with the blackest of blues and the greasiest funky soul you've ever heard in an improv setting."

Author Gary Giddins described the album as "exuberant," and stated that the musicians "rouse each other in colloquies of impressive concentration and rare candor."

Track listing

 "Me & Wadud, Part I" (Hemphill) – 9:41
 "'C'" (Hemphill) – 9:24
 "Sigure" (Wadud) – 16:10
 "Me & Wadud, Part II" (Hemphill) – 9:41
 "For Billie" (Hemphill) – 8:29
 "Dream" (Hemphill) – 7:49

Personnel 
 Julius Hemphill – saxophone
 Abdul Wadud – cello

References

1993 live albums
Julius Hemphill live albums
Abdul Wadud (musician) albums
Music & Arts live albums